The Miracle of the Cross at the Ponte di Rialto (Italian: Miracolo della Croce a Rialto), also known as The Healing of the Madman, is a painting by Italian Renaissance artist Vittore Carpaccio, dating from c. 1496. It is now housed at the Gallerie dell'Accademia in Venice.

History
The painting was commissioned for the Grand Hall of the  Scuola Grande di San Giovanni Evangelista, the seat of the eponymous brotherhood in Venice. The commission included a total of nine large canvasses by prominent artists of the time, including Gentile Bellini, Perugino, Vittore Carpaccio, Giovanni Mansueti, Lazzaro Bastiani and Benedetto Rusconi. 

The subject of the paintings was to be the miracles of a fragment of the True Cross. The item had been donated to the brotherhood by Philippe de Mézières (or Filippo Maser), chancellor of the Kingdom of Cyprus and Jerusalem in 1369, and soon became the object of veneration in the city.

The canvasses were all executed in 1494–1496. All survive today, aside from that by Perugino, and were donated to the Gallerie dell'Accademia in 1820 after the fall of the Venetian Republic and Napoleonic suppressions.

In December 2019, conservation treatment sponsored by the non-profit organization Save Venice Inc. was undertaken in order to remove surface dirt, old varnish, discolored inpainting and residue left from earlier 19th-century treatments.

Description

The painting shows the miracle of the healing of a madman through the relic of the Holy Cross, held by the Patriarch of Grado  Francesco Querini, which took place in the   Palazzo a San Silvestro on the  Canal Grande, near the Rialto Bridge. The scene has an asymmetrical composition, with figures in the foreground at the left and, behind them, the façade of the buildings following the canal. They feature the typical inverted cone chimneys of medieval Venice.

The miraculous event is relegated to a wide loggia in the upper left corner: most of the canvas is occupied by a veduta with a great number of  characters and naturalistic items. The people include a group of walkers who precede the religious procession following the relic. The bridge is still in wood, as it was  before it collapsed in 1524. Like the current version (dating from 1591) it had a double row of shops at the sides and, at the top, a movable  boardwalk needed to allow the passage of the taller vessels. 

On the right is the 15th-century appearance of the  Fondaco dei Tedeschi, destroyed by a fire in January 1505. Other architectural features include the bell tower of San Giovanni Crisostomo, the portico of Ca' da Mosto and the bell tower of Santi Apostoli before its reconstruction in   1672.

Details of human activities include the private gondolas used as ferries, the presence of numerous foreigners with eastern style garments, women clearing carpets, and workers who are clearing their barrels.

See also
Procession in St. Mark's Square
Miracle of the Cross at the Bridge of S. Lorenzo
 100 Great Paintings

Sources

External links

Web Gallery of Art

1490s paintings
Paintings by Vittore Carpaccio
Paintings in the Gallerie dell'Accademia
Religious paintings
Venice in art
Paintings of Venice